Hans-Peter Lehmann (born 15 December 1934) is a German opera and artistic director.

Life 
Born in Kassel, Lehmann was born son of the sculptor  and an art historian. Afterwards he studied music at the Hochschule für Musik Detmold from 1955 to 1957 and completed from 1957 to 1958 a study of art history and theatre studies at the Free University of Berlin.

After his studies, Lehmann became assistant of Carl Ebert and Gustav Rudolf Sellner at the Deutsche Oper Berlin and assisted Wieland and Wolfgang Wagner at the Bayreuth Festival between 1960 and 1973. In 1970, he staged Wagner's Tannhäuser at the Bayerischen Staatsoper München, and in 1974 Zimmermann's Die Soldaten in Nuremberg.

From 1976 to 1980 Lehmann worked as opera director at the Hessisches Staatstheater Wiesbaden and from 1980 to 2001 was opera director at the Staatsoper Hannover.

Bibliography 
 Sabine Sonntag: Danach trachtet mein Sinn. Die Ära Hans-Peter Lehmann an der Staatsoper Hannover 1980 bis 2001. Niedersächsische Staatstheater, Hannover 2001.
 Horst Seeger: Opern-Lexikon, 3., extended edition, extended new edition (Lizenzausgabe des Henschelverlages Kunst und Gesellschaft, Berlin. - Edition for the Federal Republic of Germany, Berlin (West), Austria and Switzerland), Wilhelmshaven: Noetzel, Heinrichshofen-Bücher, 1987, 
 Riemann Musiklexikon, Erg.-Vol. 2 (1975), 
 Birte Vogel: Hans-Peter Lehmann. In Hannover persönlich. Seewind Verlag, Wennigsen 2011. ,

External links 
 Informationen bei der Bayerischen Staatsoper

References 

German opera directors
Opera managers
Academic staff of the Hochschule für Musik, Theater und Medien Hannover
1934 births
Living people
People from Kassel